Walter Mack may refer to:

 Walter Staunton Mack Jr. (1895–1990), American businessman
 Walter Mack (swimmer) (born 1953), German Olympic swimmer